Slavsk is a town and the administrative center of Slavsky District in the Kaliningrad Oblast, Russia, located  northeast of Kaliningrad. Population figures:

History

The town was established in 1292. In 1454, King Casimir IV Jagiellon incorporated it to the Kingdom of Poland upon the request of the anti-Teutonic Prussian Confederation. After the subsequent Thirteen Years' War (1454–1466), it became a part of Poland as a fief held by the Teutonic Knights, and by Ducal Prussia afterwards.

From 1701, it formed part of the Kingdom of Prussia, and in 1819 it became seat of the Prussian Elchniederung district. In 1871 it became part of Germany. In the late 19th century, it had a population of over 1,800, partially Lithuanian. According to German data 16,000 Lithuanians lived in the district in 1890 (29% of the population). Two annual fairs were held in the town in the late 19th century.

Administrative and municipal status
Within the framework of administrative divisions, Slavsk serves as the administrative center of Slavsky District. As an administrative division, it is, together with six rural localities, incorporated within Slavsky District as the town of district significance of Slavsk. As a municipal division, the town of district significance of Slavsk is incorporated within Slavsky Municipal District as Slavskoye Urban Settlement.

Transportation
The town has a railway station on the Sovetsk-Kaliningrad railroad.

Notable residents
 Ernst Siehr (1869–1945), German lawyer and politician
 Arthur Ewert (1890–1959),German politician
 Andrei Voronkov (1967–), Russian former volleyball player

Twin towns and sister cities

Slavsk is twinned with:
 Ronneby, Sweden

References

Notes

Sources

Cities and towns in Kaliningrad Oblast
Slavsky District